Madaram Brahma was an Indian poet and dramatist, who wrote in the Bodo language, a Sino-Tibetan language spoken by the Bodo people. Born in a Bodo family in 1903 at Kokrajhar in Dundhunikhata (present day Dhubri District) of the Northeast Indian state of Assam, he passed the matriculation from the local Government High School in Dhubri. His career started as a teacher and by 1932, he became the Headmaster of the Harisingha High School, Darang. In 1945 he joined the local administration, eventually becoming the first person of Bodo ethnicity to become a Block Development Officer.

Brahma wrote several poems, songs including hymns and plays which started with Boroni Gudi Sibsa Arw Aroj, a book of hymns and prayers written in Bodo language. His other works included Khonthai Methai (Poems and Lyrics–1923), Boroni Gudi Sipsa Arw Aroj (Bodo Hymn and Prayer Songs–1926), Raimali (Drama–1926), Dimapur Nwgwr Bainai (The fall of Dimapur, drama), Sadang Bairagi (Sadang, The Sanyasi, drama), Rupesri Raithai Khantai (Rupesri- Poems and Prose–1988) and Phangseao Bibar Barnwi (Two Flowers in the Branch). Some of his works are prescribed texts for school curriculum and civil services examination. The Government of India awarded him the fourth highest civilian honour of Padma Shri in 1988.

Madaram Brahma died, aged 87, on 6 September 1990, at Rupnath Brahma Civil Hospital in his native place. A local school, Padmasri Madaram Brahma Mes School is named after him.

See also

 Bodo people
 Bodo language

References

Recipients of the Padma Shri in literature & education
1903 births
1990 deaths
Bodo people
People from Dhubri district
Poets from Assam
20th-century Indian poets
Indian male poets
Indian male dramatists and playwrights
20th-century Indian educational theorists
Dramatists and playwrights from Assam
20th-century Indian dramatists and playwrights
20th-century Indian male writers